Andi Renja (born 1 June 1993, in Korçë) is an Albanian footballer who plays as a winger.

Club career

Aris
He started his career in youth teams of Aris. During the 2012–2013 season, he was promoted him to the first team, by manager Lucas Alcaraz.

Pirin
After spending a half season in Levski Karlovo in the Bulgarian Second League, he joined Pirin Blagoevgrad's summer camp on trials and later signed with the club from Bulgarian First League. At the end of the season the club had to release him to carry out regular military service.

Vitosha
On 17 July 2018, Renja signed with Vitosha Bistritsa.

Career statistics

References

External links
 

1993 births
Living people
Footballers from Korçë
Albanian footballers
Albanian emigrants to Greece
Association football wingers
Aris Thessaloniki F.C. players
AO Chania F.C. players
FC Levski Karlovo players
OFC Pirin Blagoevgrad players
FC Vitosha Bistritsa players
Luftëtari Gjirokastër players
Kategoria Superiore players
Super League Greece players
First Professional Football League (Bulgaria) players
Second Professional Football League (Bulgaria) players
Albanian expatriate footballers
Albanian expatriate sportspeople in Greece
Albanian expatriate sportspeople in Bulgaria
Expatriate footballers in Greece
Expatriate footballers in Bulgaria